Lykke May Andersen (born 16 June 1982) is a Danish model. She is best known for her work with Victoria's Secret and the Sports Illustrated Swimsuit Issue. She was once assistant director of The Hole, an art gallery, in New York City.

Career

Playboy
Andersen  featured on the cover of the May 2012 edition of Playboy. On 19 April 2012, she held a book-signing for her cover of the May issue of Playboy at The Hole Gallery in Manhattan.

Personal life

In 2013, Andersen gave birth to a son, Shooter Sandhed Schnabel, fathered by Julian Schnabel.

References

External links

1982 births
Living people
People from Copenhagen
Danish female models